The 1926 Drake Bulldogs football team was an American football team that represented Drake University as a member of the Missouri Valley Conference (MVC) during the 1926 college football season. In their sixth season under head coach Ossie Solem, the Bulldogs compiled a 2–6 record (1–4 against MVC opponents), finished in eighth place out of ten teams in the MVC, and were outscored by a total of 118 to 60.

Schedule

References

Drake
Drake Bulldogs football seasons
Drake Bulldogs football